The 2018–19 Segunda División B season was the 42nd since its establishment. Eighty teams participated, distributed across four groups of twenty clubs each.

Overview before the season
80 teams joined the league, including three relegated from the 2017–18 Segunda División, 18 promoted from the 2017–18 Tercera División and Ibiza, that replaced Lorca FC after the latter did not fulfill the economic requirements and was banned from playing in Segunda División B.

Relegated from Segunda División
Cultural Leonesa
Barcelona B
Sevilla Atlético

Promoted from Tercera División

Almería B
Atlético Levante
Atlético Malagueño
Atlético Sanluqueño
Calahorra
Castellón
Conquense
Cultural Durango
Don Benito
Ejea
Espanyol B
Gimnástica Torrelavega
Ibiza
Internacional
Langreo
Oviedo B
Salamanca UDS
Teruel
Unionistas

Group 1

Teams and locations

League table

Results

Top goalscorers

Top goalkeepers

Group 2

Teams and locations

League table

Results

Top goalscorers

Top goalkeepers

Group 3

Teams and locations

League table

Results

1 The opponents of Ontinyent since the round 31 awarded a 1–0 w/o win each.

Top goalscorers

Top goalkeepers

Group 4

Teams and locations

League table

Results

Top goalscorers

Top goalkeepers

Average attendances
This is a list of attendance data of the teams that give an official number. They include playoffs games:

|}
Notes:
1: Team played last season in Segunda División.
2: Team played last season in Tercera División.

References

External links
Royal Spanish Football Federation

 

 
2018-19

3
Spa